The United States had diplomatic relations with the nation of East Germany (the German Democratic Republic) from 1974 to 1990.

Listed below are the head U.S. diplomatic agents to East Germany, their diplomatic rank, and the effective start and end of their service in East Germany.

List of United States ambassadors to East Germany

Heads of the U.S. Embassy at East Berlin (1974–1990)

See also

 East Germany–United States relations
 Embassy of the United States, Berlin
 Embassy of Germany, Washington, D.C.
 Ambassadors of East Germany to the United States
 Germany–United States relations
 Ambassadors of Germany to the United States
 Ambassadors of the United States to Germany

References

 
East Germany
United States 
United States
East Germany ambassadors